Hypopyra spermatophora is a moth of the family Erebidae. It is found in India (Assam).

References

Moths described in 1913
Hypopyra